Rawait Mahmood Khan (born 5 March 1982) is a former British Pakistani cricketer who played for Derbyshire, Derbyshire CB, and Pakistan Customs in a four-year first-class career which saw him bowl mostly in Second XI Championship matches.

Khan, who, with the struggling Derbyshire team often played at number nine in order to gain some bowling experience for the team, made a big impact in only his second appearance with a skilful knock of 91. He thereafter kept out of the limelight in terms of spectacular batting, though held his own as a skilful, uncontroversial opener. He finished his cricket with the major counties in 2004, instead transferring to Minor County outfit Shropshire. He was a right-handed batsman and a right-arm medium-pace bowler.

He recently moved to become fielding coach and first team player at Old Hill Cricket Club

Khan's brother, Zubair, also played first-class cricket for Derbyshire in 2000.

External links
Rawait Khan at CricketArchive 

1982 births
English cricketers
Derbyshire cricketers
Living people
English people of Pakistani descent
Pakistan Customs cricketers
Derbyshire Cricket Board cricketers
Shropshire cricketers
British sportspeople of Pakistani descent
Pakistani cricketers